Sultan Mahmud was the 39th shah of Shirvan.

Career under Farrukh Yassar 
He was appointed as wali of Mahmudabad and Salyan by his grandfather Farrukh Yassar.

Reign and exile 
He rebelled and killed his father Gazi Beg and declared himself shah. But he met resistance from local Shirvan people who rebelled against him in turn, and sent him into exile. Mahmud lived in the court of Ismail I in later years.

References 

Year of birth unknown
16th-century Iranian people